Golzar (also Romanized as Golzār) is a village in Filestan Rural District of the Central District of Pakdasht County, Tehran province, Iran. At the 2006 National Census, its population was 5,451 in 1,354 households. The following census in 2011 counted 5,573 people in 1,487 households. The latest census in 2016 showed a population of 5,897 people in 1,673 households; it was the largest village in its rural district.

References 

Pakdasht County

Populated places in Tehran Province

Populated places in Pakdasht County